Michael Stuhlbarg (born July 5, 1968) is an American actor. He is known as a character actor having portrayed a variety of roles in film, television and theatre. He has received several awards including two Screen Actors Guild Awards with nominations for two Primetime Emmy Awards, four Tony Awards, and a Golden Globe Award.

He rose to prominence as troubled university professor Larry Gopnik in the 2009 dark comedy film A Serious Man, directed by Joel and Ethan Coen. Stuhlbarg has since become known as a character actor and has appeared in numerous films and television series portraying real life figures, such as George Yeaman in Lincoln (2012), Lew Wasserman in Hitchcock (2012), Andy Hertzfeld in Steve Jobs (2015), Edward G. Robinson in Trumbo (2015), Abe Rosenthal in The Post (2017), and Stanley Edgar Hyman in Shirley (2020). His other supporting roles include Hugo (2011), Men in Black 3 (2012), Blue Jasmine (2013), Pawn Sacrifice (2014), Arrival (2016), Call Me by Your Name, and The Shape of Water (both 2017). He joined the Marvel Cinematic Universe appearing as Nicodemus West in Doctor Strange (2016), and Doctor Strange in the Multiverse of Madness (2022).

Stuhlbarg's most notable roles in television include his performances of Arnold Rothstein in HBO's Boardwalk Empire (2010–2013), Richard A. Clarke in The Looming Tower (2018), and as Richard Sackler in Dopesick (2021), for which he was nominated for the Primetime Emmy Award for Outstanding Supporting Actor in a Limited or Anthology Series or Movie. His other television appearances include FX's Fargo (2017), Showtime's Your Honor (2020–present), and HBO's The Staircase (2022). On stage, Stuhlbarg has acted in numerous productions including the 2005 debut of Martin McDonagh's The Pillowman on Broadway, for which he won a Drama Desk Award and received a Tony Award nomination.

Early life
Stuhlbarg was born in Long Beach, California, the son of Susan and Mort Stuhlbarg, philanthropists. He was raised as a Reform Jew. He has said, "It's more of a spiritual resonance as opposed to particularly of Judaism." Stuhlbarg trained at The Juilliard School in New York City, where he was a member of the Drama Division's Group 21 (1988–1992). He graduated from Juilliard with a Bachelor of Fine Arts degree in 1992.

Stuhlbarg also studied acting at the University of California, Los Angeles, the Vilnius Conservatory in Lithuania, the British American Drama Academy at Oxford, and the National Youth Theatre of Great Britain at the University of London. He also studied mime with Marcel Marceau. Stuhlbarg is married to Mai-Linh Lofgren.

Career

1993–2005
Stuhlbarg began his career appearing in stage productions. In a 1993 production of Saint Joan, Stuhlbarg portrayed Charles VII of France; however, UPI critic Frederick M. Winship thought that Stuhlbarg was miscast in the production. The following year, he portrayed the title character in a production of Richard II. Writing for The New York Times, theater critic David Richards dubbed Stuhlbarg a "promising young actor", yet felt his portrayal of Richard came across as a "blend of Rasputin and an odious rent collector is altogether unavoidable, but I'd like to believe it's not his fault." He starred in the two character play Old Wicked Songs throughout late 1995. For his role in the 1996 production of the Eugene O'Neill play Long Day's Journey into Night, Stuhlbarg won the Elliot Norton Award for Outstanding Actor in a large company production. In a 1997 production of Henry VIII, Stuhlbarg played multiple roles, including Thomas Cranmer.

Stuhlbarg made his film debut in the 1998 drama A Price Above Rubies, which starred Renée Zellweger. In the 1999 Studio 54 production of the musical Cabaret, Stuhlbarg played Ernst Ludwig, a German who in the course of the production is revealed to be a Nazi. Stuhlbarg played the dual role of both Time and Clown in a 2000 production of William Shakespeare's The Winter's Tale; The New York Press critic Jonathan Kalb praised his "endearing stutter and hopping gait". In the Tim Blake Nelson-directed war drama The Grey Zone (2001), Stuhlbarg played a Jewish Hungarian who becomes a Sonderkommando in the Nazi Germany Auschwitz-Birkenau extermination camp. Stuhlbarg had previously appeared in the play of the same by Nelson in 1996. Following appearances in productions of Cymbeline, Twelfth Night, and The Persians, Stuhlbarg gave a critically acclaimed performance in the 2005 Broadway production of the Martin McDonagh play The Pillowman. He played Michal, a mentally damaged man who has suffered years of abuse from his parents and gained 50 pounds for the role. Ben Brantley of The New York Times praised Stuhlbarg for "boldly and expertly" capturing "both the innocence and ugliness of Michal". Stuhlbarg won a Drama Desk Award for Outstanding Featured Actor in a Play and received his first Tony Award nomination for his performance.

2006–2013
In 2006, Stuhlbarg appeared in the plays Measure for Pleasure and The Voysey Inheritance. He played a recurring role on Aaron Sorkin's television series Studio 60 on the Sunset Strip from 2006 to 2007, which aired for one season. His first film appearance of 2008 was the independent drama Afterschool, in which he played a "sanctimonious" high school principal and he had a one-line scene in Ridley Scott's Body of Lies as a lawyer. Also in 2008, Stuhlbarg portrayed Prince Hamlet in Oskar Eustis' production of William Shakespeare's Hamlet at the Delacorte Theater. In August of that year, Stuhlbarg was cast as the lead character in the Coen brothers film A Serious Man. The dark comedy, in which he portrayed troubled Jewish university professor Larry Gopnik, was released in October 2009. In his review of the film, Chicago Sun-Times critic Roger Ebert felt that "Much of the success of A Serious Man comes from the way Michael Stuhlbarg plays the role. He doesn't play Gopnik as a sad-sack or a loser, a whiner or a depressive, but as a hopeful man who can't believe what's happening to him. He was nominated for Golden Globe Award for Best Actor – Motion Picture Musical or Comedy for his performance in the film. Cold Souls, his other release of 2009, featured Stuhlbarg in a smaller role as a hedge fund consultant, and he also guest starred in the episode "There's No Place Like Mode" of the comedy series Ugly Betty.

Beginning in September 2010, Stuhlbarg portrayed organized crime boss Arnold Rothstein in Terence Winter's HBO crime drama series Boardwalk Empire. The character was written off after the show's fourth season in 2013. Martin Scorsese directed the pilot episode of the show, after having previously directed Stuhlbarg in the short film The Key to Reserva (2007). In Scorsese's historical adventure film Hugo (2011), Stuhlbarg played René Tabard, a film historian. Stuhlbarg appeared in the science fiction comedy sequel Men in Black 3 (2012) as Griffin, an alien with clairvoyant abilities who helps Agent J (played by Will Smith) and K (played by Tommy Lee Jones and Josh Brolin) on their mission. The film's director, Barry Sonnenfeld, said that after seeing Stuhlbarg's script and notebook filled with "tiny scribbles, notes, diagrams" that “It made me suspect that perhaps I had actually cast an alien. To Michael, all his little notations made sense. To me, they were scary and indecipherable.” Later in the year, Stuhlbarg briefly appeared as a hitman alongside his Boardwalk Empire co-star Michael Pitt in the opening scene of Martin McDonagh's dark comedy Seven Psychopaths. His third release of 2012 was the historical drama Lincoln, directed by Steven Spielberg and starring Daniel Day-Lewis as President Abraham Lincoln. In the film, he portrayed Democratic Congressman George Yeaman, representative of Kentucky. The Alfred Hitchcock biopic Hitchcock was his final release of the year, with Stuhlbarg portraying talent agent and studio executive Lew Wasserman. In Woody Allen's comedy-drama Blue Jasmine (2013), starring Cate Blanchett, Stuhlbarg appeared as a dentist who makes unwanted sexual advances to Blanchett's character.

2014–present

Stuhlbarg played chess grandmaster Bobby Fischer's manager, Paul Marshall, in the 2014 film Pawn Sacrifice, starring Tobey Maguire as Fischer. In Danny Boyle's 2015 Steve Jobs biopic, Stuhlbarg portrayed computer scientist Andy Hertzfeld, who was a member of the original Mac team. He appeared in two more biographical films in that year – Trumbo, based on the life of screenwriter Dalton Trumbo (played by Bryan Cranston), featured Stuhlbarg portraying actor Edward G. Robinson, who was accused of having ties to the Communist Party during the Hollywood blacklist and Stuhlbarg played a supporting role in Don Cheadle's Miles Ahead, based on the life of Miles Davis. Stuhlbarg played a CIA agent in the science fiction drama Arrival (2016), appearing alongside Amy Adams, Jeremy Renner, and Forest Whitaker as they attempt to translate communications from an extraterrestrial craft. In the same month, Stuhlbarg played Nicodemus West, colleague and rival to the titular character (played by Benedict Cumberbatch) in the superhero film Doctor Strange. In his final release of the year, the political thriller Miss Sloane, Stuhlbarg featured as an Irish lobbying firm head battling against gun control. Brian Truitt of USA Today praised his "superb" performance and declared him "One of the best in Hollywood right now".

In the third season of the crime anthology television series Fargo, Stuhlbarg played Sy Feltz, loyal and dedicated business partner to Ewan McGregor's character Emmit Stussy. The season premiered in April 2017. In November, Stuhlbarg co-starred as Samuel Perlman, an archaeology professor, whose son Elio (played by Timothée Chalamet) develops a relationship with his father's assistant (played by Armie Hammer), in the romantic drama Call Me by Your Name. Stuhlbarg was moved by Perlman's "sense of generosity and love and understanding" and director Luca Guadagnino said he cast Stuhlbarg because he wanted "someone who could carry a sort of softness and warmth and at the same time communicate a great knowledge and great culture". Perlman's consoling speech given to his son in the film was described by Huffington Post writer Nell Minow as being "one of the most moving scenes ever filmed." For Guillermo del Toro's fantasy drama The Shape of Water, released in December 2017 to critical and box office success, Stuhlbarg was required to speak Russian to play Dr. Robert Hoffstetler, a Soviet spy. His final performance of 2017 and second release of December, was as The New York Times executive editor A. M. Rosenthal, in Steven Spielberg's political thriller The Post, which starred Tom Hanks and Meryl Streep and depicts the publishing of the Pentagon Papers by journalists from The Washington Post and The Times. With his performances in Call Me By Your Name, The Shape of Water, and The Post, he became the sixth actor to appear in three films nominated for the Academy Award for Best Picture in the same year.

Stuhlbarg was due to appear as Gore Vidal's domestic partner Howard Austen in the biopic Gore, starring Kevin Spacey as Vidal, but the film was withdrawn from release during post-production amid ongoing sexual misconduct allegations against Spacey. He appeared in the 2018 miniseries The Looming Tower as counter-terrorism czar Richard A. Clarke, for which he received a Primetime Emmy Award nomination.

In the miniseries Your Honor (2020), Stuhlbarg played Jimmy Baxter, the mob boss of a prominent organized crime family in the city of New Orleans.

Filmography

Film

Television

Theatre

Awards and nominations

References

External links

 
 
 

1968 births
American male film actors
American male stage actors
American male television actors
Drama Desk Award winners
Jewish American male actors
Juilliard School alumni
Living people
Male actors from Long Beach, California
20th-century American male actors
21st-century American male actors
Lithuanian Academy of Music and Theatre alumni
American Reform Jews
UCLA Film School alumni
National Youth Theatre members
21st-century American Jews